Gloria Cranmer Webster  (born July 4, 1931) is a Canadian First Nations activist, museum curator and writer of Kwakwaka'wakw descent.

Biography
The daughter of Dan Cranmer, a chief of the Kwakwaka'wakw, she was born Gloria Cranmer in Alert Bay, British Columbia. She is a great-granddaughter of ethnologist George Hunt. She moved to Victoria, British Columbia, when she was 14 and attended high school there. She graduated in anthropology from the University of British Columbia in 1956, the first indigenous person to be admitted to that university. She worked as a counsellor at Oakalla Prison in British Columbia for two years. She then worked two years for the John Howard Society. While she was there, she met John Webster. They married and she moved to Saskatchewan; the couple had a daughter in Regina. After 18 months, the family moved to Vancouver, where she worked as a counsellor at the YWCA. The couple had two sons and Webster left that job to raise her family. She returned to work as a counsellor at the Vancouver Indian Centre. Then, in 1971, she was hired as assistant curator for the Museum of Anthropology at UBC.

Webster was a driving force behind the establishment of the U’Mista Cultural Centre at Alert Bay, which opened in 1980, and served as its curator for a number of years. She helped retrieve cultural treasures confiscated from her people by Canadian authorities during raids on potlatches during the 1920s.

Webster worked with a linguist from UBC to develop a written orthography for the Kwak'wala language. She also wrote books that are used to teach that language.

She was narrator for a 1973 documentary film The Potlatch: A Strict Law Bids us Dance.

Awards and honours
In 2017, she was named an Officer in the Order of Canada.

References

External links 
 

1931 births
Living people
University of British Columbia alumni
Canadian curators
Officers of the Order of Canada
Kwakwaka'wakw people
First Nations women writers
First Nations activists
Writers from British Columbia
20th-century Canadian non-fiction writers
20th-century Canadian women writers
21st-century Canadian non-fiction writers
21st-century Canadian women writers
20th-century First Nations writers
21st-century First Nations writers
Canadian women non-fiction writers
Canadian women curators